The Santa Monica–Lawton Bridge, also known as the Kalayaan Bridge and Bonifacio Global City–Ortigas Link Bridge, is a four-lane, two-way bridge across the Pasig River that connects Lawton Avenue in Makati to Fairlane Street (near Santa Monica Street to where the bridge is also named after) in Kapitolyo, Pasig. The bridge also includes a  viaduct that connects it to 8th Avenue in Bonifacio Global City, Taguig.

The bridge aims to decongest nearby thoroughfares like EDSA and Circumferential Road 5 and cut travel time between Taguig and Ortigas from 30 minutes or 1 hour to only 12 minutes. The bridge was partially opened on June 12, 2021, with the completion of its key component, the Kalayaan Bridge, while the Lawton Avenue – Global City Viaduct opened on October 1, signaling the full completion of the bridge.

The bridge is currently passable to light vehicles only and does not allow full pedestrian access along the bridge.

History

The bridge was conceived only during the administration of President Benigno Aquino III as Phase I of the  Bonifacio Global City–Ortigas Link Road Project which would connect the Bonifacio Global City in Taguig to the Ortigas Center in Pasig. The groundbreaking ceremony on the project took place as part of the Build! Build! Build! Infrastructure Program under the Duterte administration on July 19, 2017, marking the official start of construction. The project is handled by a joint venture of Persan Construction, Inc. and Sino Road and Bridge Group Company Ltd., with consultants DCCD Partners and Pertconsult International. Aside from the bridge itself, the construction project also includes improving access to the bridge by upgrading Brixton and Fairlane Streets on the Ortigas side and 8th Avenue on the BGC side. The bridge was originally expected to open in 2020, but was delayed to 2021 due to the COVID-19 pandemic.

The main section of the bridge was inaugurated by top government officials on June 12, 2021, coinciding with the Philippine Independence Day commemorations. It partially opened to vehicles on the same day. The southbound lane to Lawton Avenue was made accessible to vehicles on the same day, while the northbound lane was accessible to vehicles the following day. The Lawton Avenue – Global City Viaduct was then inaugurated by President Rodrigo Duterte on September 30, 2021 and was opened on the next day.

Bridge layout

The bridge consists of a 4-lane main bridge spanning  that connects Lawton Avenue in Makati to Fairlane Street in Kapitolyo, Pasig across the Pasig River and J. P. Rizal Avenue, known as the Kalayaan Bridge. It also includes the Lawton Avenue – Global City Viaduct, a 2-lane,  viaduct that connects the main bridge to 8th Avenue in Bonifacio Global City, Taguig across Kalayaan Avenue.

Criticism 
When the Santa Monica–Lawton Bridge was opened to traffic on June 12, 2021, the lack of pedestrian access being immediately available upon its opening was criticized online. Furthermore, observations noted that pedestrians were also being forced to use several flights of stairs located on both ends of the bridge instead of being able to walk along the bridge from end to end.

The location and route of the bridge on the Mandaluyong and Pasig side has also been criticized for drawing and introducing traffic congestion onto the Kapitolyo neighborhood and the narrow Brixton Street in what an urban planner describes as "an example of Braess's paradox".

On June 23, 2022, Binibining Cebu 2016 winner Raine Baljak posted a video on TikTok where she tried to walk from Bonifacio Global City to Mandaluyong City on foot, in which Google Maps gave directions for her to use the bridge, despite its narrow and incomplete sidewalk. As a result, the video went viral and sparked multiple online discussions on the quality of pedestrian infrastructure in the country.

See also 
 List of crossings of the Pasig River
 Metro Manila Dream Plan

References 

Pasig River
Bridges completed in 2021
Bridges in Metro Manila
Buildings and structures in Makati
Buildings and structures in Pasig
Buildings and structures in Taguig